The Citroën C3 WRC is a rally car designed and developed by the Citroën World Rally Team to compete in the World Rally Championship. The car, which is a replacement for the successful Citroën DS3 WRC, is based on the Citroën C3. The C3 WRC made its début at the start of the 2017 season, where it was driven by Craig Breen, Stéphane Lefebvre and Kris Meeke, with Khalid Al Qassimi entering a fourth car at selected events.

Development history

Citroën formally announced its intentions to withdraw from full-time competition at the end of the 2015 season in order to focus on the development of the C3 WRC. The team contested selected events during the 2016 season, using the DS3 WRC as a testing platform for selected parts. Further testing and development was carried out using the Citroën C-Elysée WTCC, the car used by Citroën in the World Touring Car Championship. The C3 WRC's début in 2017 coincided with the widespread revisions to the sport's technical regulations.

WRC victories

WRC results

* Season still in progress.

See also
 World Rally Car
 Ford Fiesta RS WRC
 Ford Fiesta WRC
 Hyundai i20 WRC
 Hyundai i20 Coupe WRC
 Mini John Cooper Works WRC
 Toyota Yaris WRC
 Volkswagen Polo R WRC

References

External links
Technical details at wrc.com

World Rally Cars
Citroën vehicles
All-wheel-drive vehicles